MS Romantika is a cruiseferry owned by the Estonian ferry company Tallink. The ship is on charter to Holland Norway Lines on a route Kristiansand to Eemshaven. She was built in 2002 by Aker Finnyards, Rauma and she was the first ever newbuilding to be delivered to Tallink. Between 2002 and 2006 the Romantika was used on the Helsinki–Tallinn route, until she was replaced by the new MS Galaxy. After this she was transferred to the Tallinn–Stockholm route, sailing parallel with her sister MS Victoria I.

After the delivery of  the Romantika was transferred to the Stockholm–Riga route in May 2009. Simultaneously with this she was changed from Estonian to Latvian registry.

In December 2016, with the return of Silja Europa, Tallink reorganized the routes of their ferries and Romantika was transferred to the Stockholm - Riga route from December 12.

From July to September 2021 Romantika was chartered to Morocco's Tanger-Med Port Authority for services between Morocco and Sète in France.

On 13 October 2021, she arrived in Glasgow to provide accommodation for people attending the COP26 summit.

Since April 2022, the Romantika is operated by Holland Norway Lines on a Kristiansand - Eemshaven routing on charter. This charter was announced on 1 November 2021, and is due to last three years with two one-year extensions.

See also
Largest ferries of Europe

Notes

References

External links

 Tallink silja website for MS Romantika
 MS Romantika at Fakta om Fartyg 
 Romantika at marinetraffic.com

 

Ferries of Estonia
Ships built in Rauma, Finland
Cruiseferries
2001 ships
Ships of Latvia